2012 Spark is the thirty-fifth single by the Japanese Pop-rock band Porno Graffitti. It was released on February 8, 2012.

Track listing

References

2012 singles
Porno Graffitti songs
2012 songs
SME Records singles
Japanese film songs